The 2014 FIBA Europe Under-16 Championship for Women Division B was the 11th edition of the Division B of the European basketball championship for women's national under-16 teams. It was played in Tallinn, Estonia, from 31 July to 10 August 2014. Germany women's national under-16 basketball team won the tournament.

Participating teams

  (16th place, 2013 FIBA Europe Under-16 Championship for Women Division A)

  (15th place, 2013 FIBA Europe Under-16 Championship for Women Division A)

  (14th place, 2013 FIBA Europe Under-16 Championship for Women Division A)

First round
In the first round, the teams were drawn into four groups. The first two teams from each group will advance to the Quarterfinal Groups E and F and the other teams will advance to the 9th–17th place classification (Groups G, H and I).

Group A

Group B

Group C

Group D

1st–8th place classification

Group E

Group F

9th–17th place classification

Group G

Group H

Group I

15th–17th place classification

12th–14th place classification

9th–11th place classification

5th–8th place playoffs

Championship playoffs

Final standings

References

2014
2014–15 in European women's basketball
International youth basketball competitions hosted by Estonia
FIBA U16
August 2014 sports events in Europe